Alaa El-Din El-Shafei (born 18 May 1950) is an Egyptian water polo player. He competed in the men's tournament at the 1968 Summer Olympics.

References

External links
 

1950 births
Living people
Egyptian male water polo players
Olympic water polo players of Egypt
Water polo players at the 1968 Summer Olympics
Sportspeople from Cairo
20th-century Egyptian people